The DTA Alizés is a French ultralight trike that was designed by Michel Guaiguant and is produced by DTA sarl of Montélimar.

The aircraft is a joint venture with wing manufacturer La société Ellipse who market it as the Ellipse Alizé. It is supplied as a complete ready-to-fly-aircraft.

Design and development
The aircraft also fits the US FAR 103 Ultralight Vehicles rules.

The Alizés features a cable-braced Ellipse Fuji hang glider-style high-wing, weight-shift controls, a single-seat open cockpit with no cockpit fairing, tricycle landing gear without wheel pants and a single engine in pusher configuration.

The Alizés is a very simple nanotrike and is made from bolted-together aluminum tubing, with its single surface wing covered in Dacron sailcloth. Its  span wing is supported by a single tube-type kingpost and uses an "A" frame weight-shift control bar. The powerplant is a single cylinder, air-cooled, two-stroke,  Zenoah G25 engine.

Due to its single seat configuration and "niche appeal", the aircraft has not sold in large numbers.

Variants
Ellipse Alizé
Model sold in the early 2010s by wing manufacturer La société Ellipse, with either the Fuji or Ellipse Titan CX strut-braced wing and powered by a Cors-Air  engine.
Ellipse Fuji 16 Alizé
Model sold in the mid-2010s by wing manufacturer La société Ellipse, with the Fuji 16 cable-braced wing and powered by a Cors-Air  engine. Reviewer Dimitri Delemarle described it as "a versatile wing, easy for a new pilot to handle yet rewarding to fly".
Ellipse Titan CX Alizé
Model sold in the mid-2010s by wing manufacturer La société Ellipse, with the Ellipse Titan CX strut-braced wing and powered by a Cors-Air  engine, or starting in 2014, a Swissauto motor.

Specifications (Alizés)

References

External links
Official DTA website
Official Ellipse website

Alizés
2000s French sport aircraft
2000s French ultralight aircraft
Single-engined pusher aircraft
Ultralight trikes